Peoria City Hall, located in the United States city of Peoria, Illinois, was designed and built by Reeves and Baillee in 1897 for US$271,500.  The city hall was dedicated January 5 to January 7, 1899. The building is still Peoria's city hall and is listed on the National Register of Historic Places.  The Peoria Civic Center was built behind it in 1982.

Notes

External links

City of Peoria — official website

Survey number HABS IL-1129 — Peoria City Hall, 419 Fulton Street, Peoria, Peoria County, IL

City hall
National Register of Historic Places in Peoria County, Illinois
Peoria, Illinois
City and town halls on the National Register of Historic Places in Illinois
1899 establishments in Illinois